Secrets d’alcôve is a 1954 French comedy film made up of four sketches by Henri Decoin (segment "Le billet de logement"), Jean Delannoy ("Le lit de la Pompadour"),  Gianni Franciolini ("Le divorce") and Ralph Habib ("Riviera-Express"). Kingsley International released the film in the UK.

Cast by segment
"Le Billet de logement" features Jeanne Moreau and Richard Todd.
"Le Lit de la Pompadour" with Martine Carol, François Périer and Bernard Blier 
"Le Divorce" with Dawn Addams and Vittorio De Sica
"Riviera-Express" with Françoise Arnoul and Marcel Mouloudji

Plot
The story brings with four travellers forced by weather to find temporary shelter who tell four stories, whose common point is a bed.
"The lodging slip" - During the war, an English officer captain Davidson comes to the house of Jeanne Plisson with a requisition slip for accommodation. Her husband is absent at the front while she is pregnant. During the night, she gives birth and Davidson must act as midwife.
"The Divorce" - Roberto, an American living in New York wants to divorce. He shares the night at a hotel with Janet.
"Riviera Express" - truck driver Riquet meets Martine whose car has broken down.
"The bed of Pompadour" - a bed is mis-delivered to Agnes

References

1954 films
1950s French-language films
French anthology films
Films directed by Henri Decoin
Films directed by Jean Delannoy
Films directed by Gianni Franciolini
Films directed by Ralph Habib
French black-and-white films
1950s French films